Joe Dolan (born 27 May 1980) is an English-born Northern Irish former footballer who last played for Walton Casuals.

As a professional footballer, he played in the Football League for Millwall, Stockport County, Brighton & Hove Albion and Leyton Orient. He featured for 18 teams throughout his career, failing to make an appearance for Chelsea.

Professional career 
After playing for the youth team of non-League Elmstead, Dolan started his career as a trainee at Chelsea, but was unable to feature for the first team after signing a professional contract ahead of the 1997-98 season. On 15 April 1998, Dolan completed a move to Millwall. The defender was a regular at The Den until breaking his leg, but was unable to reproduce his ability after recovering from the injury.

In October 2004, Dolan joined Crawley Town on a three-month loan deal. Scoring once in 12 appearances for the Red Devils, he also had temporary stays with Stockport County and Brighton & Hove Albion for the remainder of the campaign. He was released at the end of the season.

Dolan joined Leyton Orient on 5 July 2005, but only managed two appearances before his release in January 2006. During his time with the club, he returned to Stockport County on loan while also featuring for Fisher Athletic.

Semi-professional career 
Dolan joined Canvey Island in January 2006, making his first permanent transfer in non-league football. He remained with the club for the 2005–06 season, before joining Basingstoke Town in July 2006. Spending three years at the Camrose, he left the club to join Isthmian Premier Division side Carshalton Athletic in October 2009, reuniting with former Basingstoke manager Francis Vines.

In February 2010, Dolan joined Isthmian Division One South side Croydon Athletic, before signing for Cray Wanderers nine months later. However, after just a month with the Wands he joined Kingstonian. In March 2011, he dual registered with Conference South outfit Lewes, before eventually joining Bromley.

Following a short stay with Staines Town, he signed for Havant & Waterlooville in February 2012. Dolan scored an injury time winner against his former club to save Havant from relegation, but was released at the end of the season.

Joining Metropolitan Police for the 2012–13 season, he made the move to Walton Casuals in the final weeks of the season before retiring from non-league football. He later moved to Australia and gained his UEFA A Licence.

Coaching career 
In April 2013, following his retirement from playing, Dolan joined Crystal Palace as an Under-12 coach and Head of Education and Welfare. Having gained his UEFA A Licence, he became Director or Football at The Southport School in January 2015 following a move to Australia.

International career 
Dolan played five teams for the Northern Ireland U18 team, and six times for the Northern Ireland U21 team. On 24 August 1998, Dolan made his international debut in a 2–1 win over Wales. He also featured against Moldova, Germany on two occasions and Republic of Ireland.

On 8 October 1999, he made his U21 debut in a 2–1 defeat to Finland. He later played against Malta twice, Scotland, Denmark and Iceland. In his international career, Dolan recorded four wins, three draws and four defeats.

External links

References

1980 births
Living people
Footballers from Southwark
English footballers
Association football defenders
Northern Ireland under-21 international footballers
Chelsea F.C. players
Millwall F.C. players
Crawley Town F.C. players
Stockport County F.C. players
Brighton & Hove Albion F.C. players
Leyton Orient F.C. players
Fisher Athletic F.C. players
Canvey Island F.C. players
Basingstoke Town F.C. players
Carshalton Athletic F.C. players
Croydon Athletic F.C. players
Cray Wanderers F.C. players
Kingstonian F.C. players
Bromley F.C. players
Staines Town F.C. players
Havant & Waterlooville F.C. players
Metropolitan Police F.C. players
Walton Casuals F.C. players
English Football League players
National League (English football) players
Isthmian League players